The Principe Amedeo class was a pair of ironclad warships built for the Italian Regia Marina (Royal Navy) in the 1870s and 1880s. They were the culmination of a major naval construction program designed to give Italy a powerful fleet of ironclads. The ships had uneventful careers, spending much of it in Italy's colonial empire. By the late 1880s, they were withdrawn from service and employed in secondary roles, first as headquarters ships for harbor defenses. Principe Amedeo was converted into a depot ship in 1895 and was discarded in 1910, while Palestro was used as a training ship from 1894 to 1900 before being scrapped between 1902 and 1904.

Design
In 1862, the Italian government under Prime Minister Urbano Rattazzi and his naval minister Carlo Pellion di Persano made the decision to build a fleet of ironclad warships. Five more ironclads were ordered from foreign shipyards, three wooden steam frigates already under construction were converted into armored ships, and four more ironclads were ordered from Italian shipyards. The two Principe Amedeo-class ships were the last two of this first generation of Italian ironclads. The design for Principe Amedeo was prepared by Inspector Engineer Giuseppe De Luca. He had initially planned on using entirely wooden hulls for the ships, but had changed to composite wood and iron construction by the time the ships were laid down.

General characteristics and machinery

The two ships differed slightly in size. Both ships displaced  normally, but Principe Amedeo displaced  at full load and Palestro reached . The ships had an inverted bow with a naval ram below the waterline. Their superstructure was minimal, consisting primarily of a small conning tower forward. They had a crew of 548 officers and men.

The ships' propulsion system consisted of one single-expansion steam engine that drove a single screw propeller, with steam supplied by six coal-fired, cylindrical fire-tube boilers. The boilers were trunked into a single funnel. The ships were barque-rigged to supplement the steam engine; Principe Amedeo and her sister were the last rigged ironclad to be built by Italy.

Armament and armor
Palestro and Principe Amedeo were both armed with a main battery of six  guns, though they were mounted differently in each ship. Principe Amedeo carried hers in a single armored casemate located amidships, while Palestros guns were mounted in three armored casemates. The first was located forward, toward the bow, the second and third were placed close to the stern on each side of the ship. Both ships also carried an  gun that was mounted forward as a bow chaser. Later in her career, Principe Amedeo received a secondary battery of six  guns and six machine guns, along with two torpedo tubes.

Ships

Service history
Neither ship had a particularly eventful career. They were completed too late to take part in the final stages of the wars of Italian unification. Instead, they were assigned to the Italian colonial empire, with occasional stints in the main Italian fleet. In 1880, Palestro took part in a naval demonstration off Ragusa in an attempt to force the Ottoman Empire to comply with the terms of the Treaty of Berlin and turn over the town of Ulcinj to Montenegro. The following year, Principe Amedeo was involved in a collision with the ironclad  during a hurricane, though neither ship was damaged.

In the late 1880s, both ships were withdrawn from frontline service and employed as headquarters ships for the defense of Taranto—Principe Amedeo—and La Maddalena—Palestro. Principe Amedeo was stricken from the naval register in 1895 and used as an ammunition depot ship in Taranto until 1910, when she was sold for scrap. Palestro was employed as a training ship between 1894 and 1900, when she too was stricken from the register. She was broken up between 1902 and 1904.

Footnotes

Notes

Citations

References

External links
 Principe Amedeo Marina Militare website